Gustavo Arellano is an American writer and journalist. He is a featured contributor for the Los Angeles Times and the former publisher and editor of Orange County's alternative weekly OC Weekly. He is most notable as the author of the column ¡Ask a Mexican!, which is syndicated nationally and has been collected into book form as ¡Ask a Mexican! (Scribner, 2008). Arellano has won numerous awards for the column, including the 2006 and 2008 Best Non-Political Column in a large-circulation weekly from the Association of Alternative Newsweeklies, the 2007 Presidents Award from the Los Angeles Press Club and an Impacto Award from the National Hispanic Media Coalition, and a 2008 Latino Spirit award from the California Latino Legislative Caucus.

In 2018, Arellano was featured in the "Tacos" episode of the hit Netflix show Ugly Delicious. He has also written an episode of the American cartoon Bordertown.

Personal life

He is a third cousin once removed of actress Jessica Alba, while his wife owns and operates a restaurant in Santa Ana. Arellano was at the OC Weekly for 15 years before resigning in 2017. In January 2019, Arellano officially became a features writer for the Los Angeles Times, covering mostly Southern California. Gustavo Arellano is an aspiring muralist.

Bibliography

 Ask a Mexican (Scribner 2007), 
 Orange County: A Personal History (Scribner, 2008), 
 Taco USA: How Mexican Food Conquered America (Scribner, 2012),

References

External links

Mireya Navarro. "The Mexican Will See You Now". The New York Times, 23 June 2007.

Mexican-American culture in California
People from Orange County, California
American writers of Mexican descent
Businesspeople from California
Living people
Year of birth missing (living people)
American advice columnists
American publishers (people)
Journalists from California